The following squads and players competed in the World Women's Handball Championship in 1999 in Norway and Denmark.

Angola 

 Justina Jose Joaquim Lopez Praca
 Maria Tavares
 Palmira de Almeida
 Ilda Bengue
 Filomena Trindade
 Elisa Webba
 Anica Miguel Joao Neto
 Felisbela Teixeira
 Maria Goncalves
 Maria Ines Jololo
 Maura Faial
 Ivone Mufuca
 Maria Cordeiro
 Regina Camumbila

Argentina 

 Sabrina Porini
 Silvina Suarez
 Citia Coppes 
 Laura Neumann
 Laura Alarcon 
 Karina Seif 
 Giselle Pintos 
 Natacha Melillo
 Astrid Klein
 Florencia Am
 Monica Garcia
 Melisa Bok
 Gisel Gimenez
 Daniela Palladino

Australia 

 Rina Bjarnason
 Petra Besta
 Shelley Ormes
 Sarah Hammond 
 Jana Jamnicky
 Vanja Karahmetovic 
 Katrina Shinfield
 Raelene Boulton
 Jovana Milosevic
 Lydia Kahmke
 Mari Edland
 Sandra Zlatanovski
 Vera Ignjatovic

Austria 

 Nataliya Rusnatchenko
 Tatyana Dzhandzhagava
 Rima Sypkuviene 
 Renata Cieloch
 Stephanie Ofenböck 
 Svetlana Mugosa Antic
 Tatjana Logvin 
 Ausra Ziukiene Fridrikas
 Beatrice Wagner
 Stanca Bozovic 
 Iris Morhammer 
 Barbara Strass
 Sorina Lefter Teodorovic
 Birgit Engl
 Doris Meltzer

Belarus 

 Natalia Petrakova
 Alesia Korabava
 Kristina Cvatko
 Alla Vaskova 
 Natallia Sysoyeva
 Larysa Mehzynskaya
 Elena Koulik
 Natalia Artemenko 
 Tatsiana Silitch 
 Tatsisna Khlimankova 
 Irina Kalpakova 
 Svetlana Minevskaya
 Natalia Tsvirko
 Ludmilla Yermachuk
 Hanna Malinskaya
 Natalia Anisimova

Brazil 

 Elana Masson
 Margarida Conte
 Ariane Roese 
 Sandra De Oliveira
 Idalina Borges Mesquita
 Lucia Da Silva
 Eva P. Fernandes Freire
 Valeria De Oliveira
 Maria Jose Batista De Sales
 Ana Maria Da Silva
 Margarita Lobo Montao
 Eliane Pereira
 Viviane Taques
 Viviani Emerick

China 

 Ge Li Yu
 Jie Fan
 Yanyan Tang
 Ji Chen 
 Chao Zhai 
 Jianfang Li
 Bing Li 
 Ying Zhao 
 Jie Cai 
 Lie Chen 
 Yang Li
 Hai Yun Chen
 Bangping Chen
 Min Wang

Republic of Congo 
 Patricia Yendea
 Lucia Chantal Okonatha
 Moukale (=Chandra Moukila?)
 Ntsinkana
 Ngayila
 Bouanga
 Bapele
 Traore
 Léontine Kibamba Nkembo
 Kagni
 
 Aurèle Itoua-Atsono
 Andomdin
 Nadia Loubaki
 Mbokewa
 Nathalie Ngayilolo.

Czech Republic 

 Lenka Černá
 Gabriela Buchtova
 Zuzana Pospisilova 
 Petra Valova 
 Erika Polozova
 Nadezda Krejcirikova 
 Renata Motalova
 Monika Ludmilova 
 Lenka Romanova
 Jarmila Majickova 
 Petra Cumplova 
 Katerina Citkova
 Renata Filipova
 Gabriela Korandova
 Renata Tarhaiova

Denmark 

 Gitte Sunesen
 Lene Rantala
 Lotte Faldborg Kiaerskou 
 Camilla Andersen
 Anja Nielsen 
 Katrine Fruelund 
 Christina Roslyng Hansen
 Line Daugaard 
 Mette Vestergaard 
 Tonje Kjaergaard 
 Merete Möller
 Kristine Andersen
 Natasja Dybmose
 Maja Grönbaek
 Louise Pedersen
 Pernille Hansen

France 

 Marie-Annick Dézert
 Valérie Nicolas
 Sonia Cendier 
 Leila Duchemann 
 Nodjalem Myaro 
 Véronique Pecqueux 
 Stéphanie Cano 
 Isabelle Wendling 
 Chantal Maio 
 Nathalie Selambarom 
 Véronique Demonière
 Laisa Lerus
 Alexandra Hector
 Sandrine Mariot Delerce
 Christelle Mathieu
 Stéphanie Ludwig

Germany 

 Michaela Schanze
 Christine Lindemann 
 Anja Unger 
 Grit Jurack 
 Bianca Urbanke 
 Janet Grunow 
 Carola Ciszewski
 Renata Hodak-Maier 
 Nikola Pietzsch
 Rasa Schulskyte
 Andrea Bölk 
 Agnieszka Tobiasz 
 Ingrida Radzeviciute
 Nadine Härdter
 Kathrin Blacha
 Turid Arndt

Hungary 

 Andrea Farkas
 Katalina Pálinger
 Beatrix Balogh
 Anikó Kántor
 Anikó Nagy
 Beatrix Kökény
 Beáta Siti
 Anita Kulcsár
 Ildikó Pádár
 Ágnes Farkas
 Rita Deli
 Gabriella Takács
 Judit Simics
 Dóra Lőwy
 Nikolett Brigovácz
 Krisztina Pigniczki

Ivory Coast 

 Elisabeth Kouassi
 Elisabeth Sokoury
 Catherine Seri Tape  
 Namama Fadika 
 Marie-Ange Gogbe 
 Etche Philomène Koko 
 Celine Affoua Dongo 
 Paula Arlette Gondo
 Alice Koudougnon 
 Mamba Diomande
 Nathalie Yohoun Kregbo

Japan 

 Ayako Yamaguchi
 Michiko Yamshita
 Masako Okidoi 
 Emiko Kamide 
 Mariko Matsumoto
 Mineko Tanaka 
 Mariko Komatsu
 Yumiko Tanaka 
 Tomomi Nakamura
 Miyoko Tanaka 
 Reiko Yamashita 
 Akane Aoto
 Mitsuko Kurachi
 Naomi Miyamoto
 Yuko Kumagai

Macedonia 

 Oksana Maslova
 Gordana Naceva
 Indira Kastratovic 
 Biljana Naumoska
 Anzela Platon 
 Mirjana Cupic
 Marina Abramova 
 Larisa Kiselova 
 Nadja Tasci
 Ljubica Georgievska
 Klara Boeva 
 Mileva Velkova 
 Biljana Risteska
 Natalia Todorovska

Netherlands 

 Joke Nynke Tienstra
 Ingeborg Vlietstra
 Diane Ordelmans
 Saskia Mulder 
 Diane Lamein
 Monique Feijen 
 Ana Razdorov 
 Martine Hekman
 Marieke Van Linder 
 Nicole Heuwekemeijer 
 Natasja Burgers 
 Olga Anne Maria Assink 
 Elly an de Boer
 Heidi Veltmaat

Norway 

 Cecilie Leganger
 Heidi Tjugum
 Susann Goksør Bjerkrheim
 Else-Marthe Sørlie
 Kjersti Grini
 Trine Haltvik
 Tonje Larsen
 Elisabeth Hilmo
 Kristine Duvholt
 Mette Davidsen
 Jeanette Nilsen
 Ann Cathrin Eriksen
 Mia Hundvin
 Sahra Hausmann
 Birgitte Sættem
 Marianne Rokne

Poland 

 Iwona Pabich
 Magdalena Chemicz
 Agnieszka Truszynska 
 Monika Marzec 
 Joanna Jurkiewicz
 Agnieszka Golinska 
 Anna Garwacka
 Sabina Wlodek 
 Agnieszka Beata Matuszewska
 Iwona Blaszkowska 
 Renata Zukiel 
 Anna Ejsmont
 Krystyna Wasiuk
 Izabela Czapko
 Aleksandra Pawelska
 Justyna Sebrala

Romania 

 Ildiko Kerekes
 Luminita Hutupan
 Valentina Cozma 
 Mihaela Ignat 
 Marinela Patru 
 Carmen Andreea Amariei 
 Sanda Criste
 Gabriela Doina Tanase
 Aurelia Stoica 
 Alina Nicoleta Dobrin 
 Cristina Georgiana Varzaru 
 Steluta Lazar Luca
 Ramona Farcau
 Talida Tolnai

Russia 

 Nigina Saidova
 Ekaterina Koulaguina
 Natalya Deryugina 
 Oksana Romenskaya 
 Zhanna Kashel 
 Tatiana Diadetchko 
 Liudmila Pazitch 
 Svetlana Mozgovaya 
 Marina Naukovich 
 Svetlana Smirnova 
 Elena Chaoussova 
 Liudmilla Chevchenko
 Irina Poltoratskaya
 Svetlana Priakhina
 Inna Suslina

South Korea 

 Nam-Soo Lee
 Min-Hee Lee
 Hye-Jeong Kwag 
 Soon-Young Huh 
 Hyun-Ok Kim
 Young-Sook Huh 
 Hyang-Ki Kim
 Jeong-Ho Hong
 Sun-Hee Han 
 Sun-Young Jang 
 Sang-Eun Lee 
 Min-Hee Lee
 Hyun-Jung Choi 
 Gyeong-Ja Moon
 Eun-Gyung Kim

Ukraine 

 Nataliya Sen
 Tetyana Vorozhtsova
 Nataliya Derepasko 
 Maryna Vergelyuk 
 Olena Iatsenko 
 Oksana Sakada
 Nataliya Martynienko
 Tetiana Brabinko-Salogub 
 Galyna Markushevska 
 Vita Markova
 Ganna Syukalo 
 Oksana Raykhel 
 Iryna Honcharova
 Olena Reznir
 Larissa Kovaleva

References 

World Women's Handball Championship squads
World Handball Championship squads